"Do You Ever Think of Me" is the only single released by Blue member Antony Costa, from his debut solo album, Heart Full of Soul. The single was released on 6 February 2006. Due to an argument between Costa and his record label, this single remains his only release in the United Kingdom.

Track listing
 UK CD1
 "Do You Ever Think of Me" (Radio Edit) - 3:15
 "Shine Your Light" - 2:58

 UK CD2
 "Do You Ever Think of Me" (Radio Edit) - 3:15
 "Runaway Train" - 3:07
 "Learn to Love Again" - 2:54
 "Do You Ever Think of Me" (Video) - 3:20

Chart performance

References

2006 songs
2006 debut singles
Songs written by Antony Costa
English pop songs